N-Oxoammonium salts are a class of organic compounds with the formula [R1R2=O]X−. The cation [R1R2=O] is of interest for the dehydrogenation of alcohols.  Oxoammonium salts are diamagnetic, whereas the nitroxide has a doublet ground state.  A prominent N-oxoammonium salt is prepared by oxidation of (2,2,6,6-tetramethylpiperidin-1-yl)oxyl, commonly referred to as [TEMPO]+.  A less expensive analogue is Bobbitt's salt.

Structure and bonding
Oxoammonium cations are isoelectronic with carbonyls and structurally related to aldoximes (hydroxylamines), and aminoxyl (nitroxide) radicals, with which they can interconvert via a series of redox steps. According to X-ray crystallography, the N–O distance in [TEMPO]BF4 is 1.184 Å, 0.1 Å shorter than the N–O distance of 1.284 Å in the charge-neutral TEMPO.  Similarly, the N in [TEMPO]+ is nearly planar, but the O moves 0.1765 Å out of the plane in the neutral TEMPO.

The N-oxoammonium salts are used for oxidation of alcohols to carbonyl groups, as well as other forms of oxoammonium-catalyzed oxidations. The nitroxyl TEMPO reacts via its N-oxoammonium salt.

See also
Nitrone – structurally related, the N-oxide of an imine

References

Functional groups
Oxycations